Leonardo Simão (born 5 June 1953) is a Mozambican politician. Simão joined the FRELIMO government in 1982 as the Director of Health in Zambezia. In 1986, he became the Minister of Health, remaining in that role until the 1994 election when he was elected to parliament. In December 1994, Simão became the Minister of Foreign Affairs and Cooperation of Mozambique under Joaquim Chissano, until February 2005 when Armando Guebuza, also of FRELIMO, became President, replacing Simão with Oldemiro Baloi.

Sources
 Leonardo Simão on Africa Database

1953 births
Living people
Foreign ministers of Mozambique
Government ministers of Mozambique
FRELIMO politicians
Recipients of the Eduardo Mondlane Order